The Trafford Park Line is a light rail line on the Manchester Metrolink network in Greater Manchester, England, running from Pomona to The Trafford Centre. Its name derives from Trafford Park, an area of the Metropolitan Borough of Trafford, and the first planned industrial estate in the world. The line opened in March 2020.

History
Between July and September 2014, Transport for Greater Manchester conducted a public consultation to build the line. In November 2014, the agency applied for power under the Transport and Works Act 1992 to build and operate the line. In October 2016, power to build the line was granted by the Secretary of State for Transport. Construction commenced in January 2017.

The final stretch of track was laid in November 2019, with the first test trams running soon after. The line opened on 22 March 2020, eight months earlier than originally planned, despite suggestions that it might be delayed as part of a review of all Metrolink services because of the COVID-19 pandemic.

Route description
The line branches off from the Eccles Line immediately south of Pomona, where provision was made for a future junction at the south–western end when the viaduct on which it sits was built in the late 1990s. Stops have been built at Wharfside, Imperial War Museum, Village, Parkway, Barton Dock Road and the Trafford Centre. Future provision has been made to extend the line to Port Salford.

Services operate as a self-contained shuttle between Cornbrook and The Trafford Centre.

Rolling stock
To provide rolling stock for the line and other service expansions, 27 Bombardier M5000 trams were ordered; these incorporate modifications to the existing fleet including new touch screen Vecom units for drivers.

References

External links

Manchester Metrolink lines
Railway lines opened in 2020
Trafford
2020 establishments in England